Giuseppe Tartini (8 April 1692 – 26 February 1770) was an Italian composer and violinist of the Baroque era born in Pirano (Piran, today part of Slovenia) the Republic of Venice. Tartini was a prolific composer, composing over a hundred of pieces for the violin with the majority of them being violin concertos. However, today, he is most famously remembered for his Violin Sonata in G Minor (the Devil's Trill Sonata).

Biography

Tartini was born on 8 April 1692 in Pirano (today part of Slovenia), a town on the peninsula of Istria, in the Republic of Venice to Gianantonio – native of Florence – and Caterina Zangrando, a descendant of one of the oldest aristocratic Piranese families.

It appears Tartini's parents intended him to become a Franciscan friar and, in this way, he received basic musical training. Tartini studied violin first at the collegio delle Scuole Pie in Capodistria (today Koper).

He studied law at the University of Padua, where he became skilled at fencing. After his father's death in 1710, he married Elisabetta Premazore, a woman his father would have disapproved of because of her lower social class and age difference. Unfortunately, Elisabetta was a favorite of the powerful Cardinal Giorgio Cornaro, who promptly charged Tartini with abduction. Tartini fled Padua to go to the monastery of St. Francis in Assisi, where he could escape prosecution. In Assisi he studied under Bohuslav Matěj Černohorský.

Legend says when Tartini heard Francesco Maria Veracini's playing in 1716, he was impressed by it and dissatisfied with his own skill. He fled to Ancona and locked himself away in a room to practice, according to Charles Burney, "in order to study the use of the bow in more tranquility, and with more convenience than at Venice, as he had a place assigned him in the opera orchestra of that city".

Tartini's skill improved tremendously and, in 1721, he was appointed Maestro di Cappella at the Basilica di Sant'Antonio in Padua, with a contract that allowed him to play for other institutions if he wished. In Padua he met and befriended fellow composer and theorist Francesco Antonio Vallotti. Between 1723 and 1725 he was in Prague, where he was master of the chapel of the Count Kinsky.

Tartini was the first known owner of a violin made by Antonio Stradivari in 1715, which Tartini bestowed upon his student Salvini, who in turn gave it to the Polish composer and virtuoso violinist Karol Lipiński upon hearing him perform: the instrument is thus known as the Lipinski Stradivarius. Tartini also owned and played the Antonio Stradivarius violin ex-Vogelweith from 1711.

In 1726, Tartini started a violin school which attracted students from all over Europe. Gradually, Tartini became more interested in the theory of harmony and acoustics and from 1750 to the end of his life he published various treatises, in which he also treated problems of music theory on a mathematical basis. He died of gangrene on 26 February 1770 in Padua.

Tartini's home town, Piran (now in Slovenia), has a statue of him in the square, which was the old harbour, originally Roman, named Tartini Square. Silted up and obsolete, the port was cleared of debris, filled, and redeveloped. One of the old stone warehouses is now the Hotel Giuseppe Tartini. His birthday is celebrated by a concert in the main town cathedral.

Compositions 

Today, Tartini's most famous work is the "Devil's Trill Sonata",  a solo violin sonata that requires a number of technically demanding double stop trills and is difficult even by modern standards. According to a legend embroidered upon by Madame Blavatsky, Tartini was inspired to write the sonata by a dream in which the Devil appeared at the foot of his bed playing the violin.

Almost all of Tartini's works are violin concerti (at least 135) and violin sonatas. Tartini's compositions include some sacred works such as a Miserere, composed between 1739 and 1741 at the request of Pope Clement XII, and a Stabat Mater, composed in 1769. He also composed trio sonatas and a sinfonia in A. Cataloguing Tartini's compositions is a challenge for scholars and editors. Tartini never dated his manuscripts, and revised works that had been completed or even published long before, making it difficult to determine when a work was written, when it was revised, and the extent of the revisions. The scholars Minos Dounias and Paul Brainard have attempted to divide Tartini's works into periods based entirely on the stylistic characteristics of the music.

Sixty-two manuscripts with compositions of Tartini are housed at the Biblioteca comunale Luciano Benincasa in Ancona.

Luigi Dallapiccola wrote a piece called Tartiniana based on various themes by Tartini.

Theoretical work

In addition to his work as a composer, Tartini was a music theorist, of a very practical bent. He is credited with the discovery of sum and difference tones, an acoustical phenomenon of particular utility on string instruments (intonation of double-stops can be judged by careful listening to the difference tone, the "terzo suono").  He published his discoveries in a treatise "Trattato di musica secondo la vera scienza dell'armonia" (Padua, 1754). His treatise on ornamentation was eventually translated into French — though when its influence was rapidly waning, in 1771 — by a certain "P. Denis", whose introduction called it "unique"; indeed, it was the first published text devoted entirely to ornament and, though it was all but forgotten, as only the printed edition survived, has provided first-hand information on violin technique for modern historically informed performances, once it was published in English translation by Sol Babitz in 1956. Of greater assistance to such performance was Erwin Jacobi's published edition.  In 1961, Jacobi published a tri-lingual edition consisting of the French (basis of the following two), English (translation by Cuthbert Girdlestone), plus Jacobi's own translation into German (Giuseppe Tartini. "Traité des agréments de la musique", trans. and ed. Erwin Jacobi. Celle: Hermann Moeck Verlag, 1961). Of significant import, Jacobi's edition also includes a facsimile of the original Italian found in Venice in 1957, copied in the hand of Giovanni Nicolai (one of Tartini's best known students) and including an opening section on bowing and a closing section on how to compose cadenzas not previously known. Another copy (though less complete) of the Italian original was found among manuscripts purchased by the University of California, Berkeley in 1958, a collection that also included numerous ornamented versions of slow movements of concertos and sonatas, written in Tartini's hand. Minnie Elmer analyzed these ornamented versions in her master's thesis at UC, Berkeley in 1959 (Minnie Elmer. "The Improvised Ornamentation of Giuseppe Tartini". Unpublished M.A. thesis. Berkeley, 1959).

Publications

Fictional portrayal 
Tartini is mentioned in Madame Blavatsky’s "The Ensouled Violin", a short story included in the collection Nightmare Tales.

The folklore of the "Devil's violin", classically exemplified by a similar story told of Niccolò Paganini, is widespread; it is an instance of the deal with the devil. A modern variant is the country song The Devil Went Down to Georgia; the PBS segment on violin in its series "Art" was titled "Art of violin: the devil's instrument".

Tartini's The Devil's Trill is the signature work of a central character in Daniel Silva's The English Assassin. Anna Rolfe, the daughter of a Swiss banker, is a famous violinist and the sonata features prominently in the novel. The story of Tartini's inspirational dream is told.

Tartini's "The Devil's Trill" is also featured in the Japanese anime Descendants of Darkness (Yami no Matsuei). The three part story is also named after the composition.

Notes

References
 Paul Brainard: "Le sonate per violino di Giuseppe Tartini Catalogo tematico" - edition "I Solisti Veneti", Padua 1975
 Giuseppe Tartini: "Scienza Platonica fondata nel cerchio" by Anna Cavalla Todeschini for Accademia Tartiniana of Padua president Enzo Bandelloni, executive committee Francesco Cavalla, Edoardo Farina, Claudio Scimone. The text reproduces an unpublished work, the manuscript is at the Sergej Mašera Maritime Museum in Piran. edizione CEDAM
 Giuseppe Tartini,Trattato di musica secondo la vera scienza dell'armonia, Nella Stamperia del Seminario, Appresso Giovanni Manfrè, Padua, 1754 – Riedizione Anastatica, Edition "I Solisti Veneti", CEDAM, Padua, 1973
 Giuseppe Tartini, De' principj dell'armonia musicale contenuta nel diatonico genere – Dissertazione, Stamperia del Seminario, Padua, 1767 – Facsimile edition, Edizione "I Solisti Veneti", CEDAM, Padua, 1974

External links

 [ Allmusic Biography]
 
 
 Tartini, a computer program that uses combination tones for pitch recognition
 L'Arte dell'Arco 
 Giuseppe Tartini – Prominent Istrians at istrianet.org

Italian Baroque composers
Italian classical violinists
Italian music theorists
 01
1692 births
1770 deaths
Composers for violin
Italian classical composers
Italian male classical composers
Male classical violinists
Istrian Italian people
People from Istria
People from Piran
18th-century Italian composers
18th-century Italian male musicians
Deal with the Devil